Manifesto: On Never Giving Up is a 2022 memoir by Bernardine Evaristo. The book has four "positive" reviews and ten "rave" reviews according to review aggregator Book Marks.

References

2022 non-fiction books
English-language books
Grove Press books
British memoirs